ATK (previously known as Atlético de Kolkata) was a professional football club based in Kolkata, West Bengal, which played in the Indian Super League until its merger with Mohun Bagan in 2020 to form ATK Mohun Bagan FC. It was established on 7 May 2014 as the first team in the Indian Super League. Initially for first three seasons Spanish La Liga club Atlético Madrid were also a co-owner, later Sanjiv Goenka bought the shares owned by Atlético Madrid. After the end of their partnership with Spanish giant, Atletico de Kolkata has been rechristened to ATK.

This list encompasses the major honours won by ATK and records set by the players and managers. The player records section includes details of the club's leading goalscorers and those who have made most appearances in first-team competitions. The club is tied for the record for the most Indian Super League titles, two, alongside Chennaiyin FC. The club's record appearance maker is Borja Fernández, who made 47 appearances(2014-2016) and the club's record goalscorer is Iain Hume, who scored 18 goals in 30 appearances(2015-2016).

All stats accurate as of match played 03 April 2018.

Honours
The club holds the most number of Indian Super League titles and were the first team to lift the ISL trophy.

National titles
Indian Super League
Winners(3): 2014, 2016, 2019-20

Players
All current players are in bold

Appearances
 Youngest player to play: Komal Thatal – 17 years 132 days (against Jamshedpur FC, ISL, 28 January 2018).
 Oldest player to play:Jussi Jääskeläinen – 42 years 226 days (against Jamshedpur FC, ISL, 1 December 2017)
 Most consecutive appearances: Pritam Kotal – 30* (25 January 2019 – Present)

Most appearances

Player records
 Most goals in a season in all competitions: Roy Krishna – 15 (2019–20)
 Most goals in league: Roy Krishna – 15 (2019–20)
 Most goals scored in a match: Iain Hume – 3 (2015), Roy Krishna - 3 (2020)
 Most goals in a cup match: Balwant Singh - 3 (2019)
 Most Hat-tricks: Iain Hume – 2 (2015-2016)
 Best goal scoring rate: Robbie Keane – 0.73
 Best goal scoring streak: Robbie Keane – 5
 Most Assists in one match: Jayesh Rane - 3 (2019, vs Delhi Dynamos)
Most Clean sheets: Arindam Bhattacharya- 13 (2018 - Present)

Overall scorers

Captains

Team records
 Biggest Win: 5-0 (vs Hyderabad FC; 25 October 2019)
 Biggest Loss: 5-1 (vs FC Goa; 28 February 2018)
 Highest attendance: 68,340 (vs Chennaiyin FC; 16 December 2015)
 Lowest attendance: 3,165 (vs NorthEast United FC; 4 March 2018)
 Fewest defeats in a season: 2 (2016 ISL Season)
 Most draws in a season: 9 (2016 ISL Season)

References

 
ATK